The 1958 UC Riverside Highlanders football team represented the University of California, Riverside as an independent during the 1958 NCAA College Division football season. Led by Carl Selin in his third and final season as head coach, UC Riverside compiled a record of 2–3–2. The team was outscored by its opponents 112 to 92 for the season. The Highlanders played home games at UCR Athletic Field in Riverside, California.

Selin finished his tenure at UC Riverside with an overall record of 4–13–3, for a .275 winning percentage.

Schedule

Notes

References

UC Riverside
UC Riverside Highlanders football seasons
UC Riverside Highlanders football